Trom is a Faroese television drama series, created by Torfinnur Jákupsson, produced by REinvent Studios, Arte, ZDF, True North and Nordic Entertainment Group, and based on the Hannis Martinsson novels by Faroese author and literary critic Jógvan Isaksen. The series was first broadcast on Kringvarp Føroya on February 17, 2022  and is available in the Nordic countries through Viaplay. The series follows journalist Hannis Martinsson (Ulrich Thomsen) as he investigates the murder of his daughter.

Synopsis
The six-part series follows a journalist, Hannis Martinsson (Ulrich Thomsen), who unexpectedly receives a message from Sonja, a  daughter he did not know of, claiming that her life is in danger. He arrives in time to help search for her and discover her body. Initially the authorities assume accidental drowning, despite anomalies in the known facts. Hannis suspects her death may have something to do with her anti-whaling activism and that a local businessman, Ragnar, is somehow involved. Although the police officer investigating Sonja's death, Karla Mohr, is also suspicious of Ragnar, she conceals evidence that might lead suspicion to fall on her own son.

Casting
Ulrich Thomsen as Hannis Martinsson
Maria Rich as Karla Mohr
Olaf Johannessen as Ragnar í Rong
Mariann Hansen as Anita Ravn
Helena Heðinsdóttir as Sonja á Heyggi
Frida av Fløtum as Turid Sonjudóttir
Gunnvá Zachariassen as Aurora á Heyggi
Hans Tórgarð as Haraldur Martinsson
Sissal Drews Hjaltalin as Jenny Mikkelsen
Magnus Reinert Gásadal as Gunnar Mohr
Hjálmar Dam as Gisli Bjarnason
Páll Danielsen as Óðin í Útistovu
Vígdis Eliesersdóttir as Kirstin Hansen
Brandur Teitsson as Trygvi í Rong

Development and release
Production work on Trom began in March 2021 and concluded in late 2021. The series was filmed in many locations across the Faroe islands, including Tórshavn and surrounding areas, and remoter villages such as Múli, Gjógv, Tjørnuvík, Velbastaður and Gasadalur.

Broadcast
The series was first shown on 12 February 2022 at a special event in Tórshavn and was broadcast the following day on Kringvarp Føroya. It was made available from 13 February through Viaplay in Sweden, Norway and Denmark, and in Australia through SBS On Demand.  The series was shown on BBC4 in the United Kingdom from 9 July 2022. The series will be broadcast in Ireland and Belgium in Autumn 2022.

References

External links 
 

Television in the Faroe Islands
2022 television series debuts
2020s drama television series